Don Marti is a writer and advocate for free and open source software, writing for LinuxWorld and Linux Today.

Marti was educated at New York University, receiving a master's degrees in science and environmental reporting.

He co-founded a Linux International member company, Electric Lichen L.L.C., which is an open-source Internet development firm. Don was the vice-president and President of the Silicon Valley Linux Users Group from 2000 to 2004 and a Technical Editor for the Linux Journal, the leading Linux publication at the time, from 2000 to 2002 and then the Editor in Chief from 2002 to 2005 editor for LinuxWorld 2006–2008.

He was the initiator of the FreedomHEC "unconference", first organized in 2006, which focused on making computer hardware more interoperate with Linux.

He was the Conference Chair for the LinuxWorld Conference and Expo from 2005 to 2009 (in 2009, its last year, it was renamed to OpenSource World).

Marti was a participation strategist at the Mozilla Corporation until 2020, when he joined CafeMedia as VP Ecosystem Innovation.

References

External links

 Articles by Don Marti at Linux Today
 

Living people
Year of birth missing (living people)
Open source advocates
Mozilla people